Saud Al-Muwaizri (born 2 November 1969) is a Kuwaiti boxer. He competed in the men's bantamweight event at the 1988 Summer Olympics.

References

External links
 

1969 births
Living people
Kuwaiti male boxers
Olympic boxers of Kuwait
Boxers at the 1988 Summer Olympics
Place of birth missing (living people)
Bantamweight boxers